Rhynchospora latifolia, known as sandswamp whitetop or tall whitetop sedge, is a species of plant in the family Cyperaceae. Modified white leaves known as bracts grow atop this 1 to 3 foot tall, grass-like plant. It is found in much of the southeastern United States.

References

latifolia